Alexander Antonitsch (born 8 February 1966) is a former tennis player from Austria, who turned professional in 1988.

Antonitsch won one singles title (1990, Seoul) and four doubles titles during his career. The right-hander reached his highest singles ATP-ranking on 9 July 1990, when he became the world No. 40.

From 1983 to 1996, he was a member of the Austrian Davis Cup team, playing 27 matches, mainly doubles; his biggest Davis Cup success was reaching the semifinals in 1990, when the Austrian team was on the brink of reaching the finals against the later 1990 Davis Cup winner USA.

ATP career finals

Singles: 3 (1 title, 2 runner-ups)

Doubles: 6 (4 titles, 2 runner-ups)

ATP Challenger and ITF Futures finals

Singles: 4 (2–2)

Doubles: 4 (2–2)

Performance timelines

Singles

Doubles

External links
 
 
 
 
 

1966 births
Living people
Austrian male tennis players
Olympic tennis players of Austria
Sportspeople from Villach
Tennis players at the 1988 Summer Olympics
Hopman Cup competitors